This article is team squads of 2014 Hassanal Bolkiah Trophy:

Group A

Myanmar
Head coach:  Gerd Friedrich Horst

Thailand
Head coach:  Sasom Pobprasert

Laos
Head coach:  Norio Tsukitate

Timor-Leste
Head coach:  Koga Takuma

Philippines
Head coach:  James David Fraser

Group B

Vietnam
Head coach:  Guillaume Graechen

Brunei
Head coach:  Kwon Oh-son

Singapore
Head coach:  Richard Boh Kok Chuan

Malaysia
Head coach:  Razip Ismail

Cambodia
Head coach:  Lee Tae-hoon

Indonesia
Head coach:  Indra Syafri Anwar

References

squads
2014